Lasalle Secondary School is located in the New Sudbury neighbourhood of Greater Sudbury, Ontario.  It offers both the English and French Immersion programs. There are three different Specialist High Skills Majors (SHSMs) available to students at Lasalle: Energy, Business and Sports. As well, the school offers a specialized program called The Sport and Healthy, Active Living (SHAL) program. The school is part of the
Rainbow District School Board. As of 2019, 971 full-time equivalent students are enrolled at the school. The students and its mascot are referred to as Lancers.

Administration
There have been many changes in the top administration of the school in recent years.

 As of Monday, October 29, 2007, Principal Ada Della Penta was promoted to superintendent. Vice-principal Craig Runciman was promoted to acting principal until August 31, 2007, and teacher Cheryl Geoghegan was promoted to acting vice-principal.

See also
List of high schools in Ontario

References

External links
 Lasalle Official Website
 Lasalle Secondary School Arts

High schools in Greater Sudbury
1962 establishments in Ontario
Educational institutions established in 1962